Black Track is the tenth studio album by pioneering jazz group Soil & "Pimp" Sessions, from Japan. It was released on April 6, 2016.

Track listing

The album was released with a version (VIZL-94) that included a DVD containing a 60-minute documentary called "Scenes by the BLACK TRACK", directed by Yohei Cogi & Felipe R. Martinez.

Credits
Performed and arranged by Soil & "Pimp" Sessions
Toasting [Agitator] – Shacho
Saxophone – Motoharu
Trumpet – Tabu Zombie
Piano – Josei
Bass – Akita Goldman
Drums – Midorin
Guest musicians - Bambu (rap on track 2), Nia Andrews (vocal on track 2), Ryosuke Nagaoka (voice and guitar on track 4), Xavier Boyer from TAHITI 80 (vocal on track 4)
Mastered by Morisaki Iysine (Saidera Mastering)
Recorded and mixed by Yasuji Okuda (studio MSR)
Executive Producer – Minoru Iwabuchi, Naoki Toyoshima (Victor)
Assistant Engineers – Hiroyuki Kishimoto (Victor Studio)
A&R, Director – Yuichi Kayada (Victor)
Piano Tuner - Shin Kano
Public Relations - Hatayama Yutakasin (Victor)
Management Staff - Takahashi Junpei (Victor)
Sales Promotion - Uemura Naofutoshi (Victor)

References

2016 albums
Soil & "Pimp" Sessions albums